Kim Jong-ok (born 1973) is a South Korean writer. He began his literary career when his short story "Georiui masulsa" (거리의 마술사 The Street Magician) won the 2012 Munhwa Ilbo New Writer's Contest. For the same short story he was also awarded Munhakdongne Young Writers' Award Grand Prize.

Life 

Kim Jong-ok was born in Seoul in 1973. He graduated in Korean Literature from Kyung Hee University. He married Son Bo-mi, a fellow writer who graduated from the same department at the same university 7 years his junior.

Writing 
In an interview, Kim Jong-ok has said that "we shouldn't judge life, but we should rather be able to listen to what life is arguing." Kim Jong-ok's stories start from waiting until certain life's moments start talking to us and carefully listening to them, rather than looking into life ourselves. His debut work "Georiui masulsa" (거리의 마술사 The Street Magician) deals with the problem of 'bullying'. However, the focus of the story is not on the social phenomenon of 'bullying' or students who are being bullied. Rather, it focuses on the memory of a bullied student who leapt to his death from the classroom window, and how that memory returns and becomes restructured in a friend of the student. Instead of explaining it as a suicide due to bullying, the friend left behind by the student, reforms the memory as having attempted a kind of 'magic', where 'feet are floating from the ground in the air, even just for a moment'. In the course of such reconstruction of the incident, the friend carefully goes over the past and reminds himself of all the stories that the dead student had told him, and such sophisticated ability to remember, is the 'magic' that this work is talking about.

As his works put emphasis on memory, Kim Jong-ok's stories are mostly narrated through the perspective of reminiscence. His book,  (과천, 우리가 하지 않은 일 Gwacheon, Something We Haven't Done), contains many stories of failed romance that are belatedly reminisced. However, the method of retrospection is unique. Therefore, Kim Jong-ok's stories give a strange feeling, though his sentences or his storytelling method are neither experimental nor complex. In his works, reminiscence does not happen in linear order for the sake of a balanced conclusion. Rather, by the act of retrospection, reasons happen by chance, and strange gaps open inside the memory, allowing something to come in accidentally. As such, though Kim Jong-ok's works have a set conclusion, it is narrated in a way where unknown gaps are embedded.

Works 
  (과천, 우리가 하지 않은 일 Gwacheon, Something We Haven't Done), 2015
 Simba the King Lion, 1995

Awards 

 Munhakdongne Young Writers' Award Grand Prize, 2015.

References 

1973 births
Living people
South Korean writers